Horn House is a Hakka bar-style house located at Mei County, Xiyang, Fuliang village. It is about 16 kilometers east of Meizhou, Guangdong, China.

This house is also called "Da Fu Di", which belongs to one of the members of the Qiu family.

This house was built by Qiu Kailin and his brother Qiu Xianglin, sons of Qiu Changsheng. In their early years, they traveled to Indonesia for business. Qiu Kailin founded the Kwong Long Company in Jakarta. After they garnered enough money, they went back to their hometown and built the house. The house was completed in 1884, after 10 years of construction. The whole house has 89 rooms.

References

Buildings and structures in Guangdong
Hakka architecture